List of school districts in Sonoma County, California.  Statistics are as of the 2008–09 academic year.

Cazadero area:
Fort Ross (K-8, 1 school, 40 students, website)
Montgomery (K-8, 1 school, 38 students)
Cloverdale Unified (K-12, 5 schools, 1520 students, website)
Cotati-Rohnert Park Unified (K-12, 13 schools, 6,654 students)
Forestville Union (K-8, 2 schools, 486 students, website)
Geyserville Unified (K-12, 5 schools, 273 students, website)
Guerneville (K-8, 2 schools, 302 students, website)
Harmony Union (K-8, 3 schools, 834 students)
Healdsburg area:
Alexander Valley Union (K-6, 1 school, 120 students, website)
Healdsburg Unified (K-12, 4 schools, 2,267 students, website)
West Side Union (K-6, 1 school, 163 students, website)
Horicon (K-8, 1 school, 86 students)
Kashia (K-8, 1 school, 11 students)
Kenwood (K-6, 1 school, 153 students, website)
Monte Rio Union (K-8, 1 school, 104 students, website)
Petaluma area:
Cinnabar (K-6, 1 school, 205 students, website)
Dunham (K-6, 1 school, 174 students, website)
Liberty (K-6, 2 schools, 635 students, website)
Old Adobe Union (K-6, 5 schools, 1,832 students, website)
Petaluma City Schools (website):
Petaluma City (Elementary) (K-6, 8 schools, 2,272 students)
Petaluma Joint Union High (7-12, 10 schools, 5,731 students)
Two Rock Union (K-6, 1 school, 152 students, website)
Waugh (K-6, 2 schools, 899 students, website)
Wilmar Union (K-6, 1 school, 224 students, website)
Santa Rosa area:
Bellevue Union (K-6, 4 schools, 1,725 students, website)
Bennett Valley Union (K-6, 2 schools, 951 students, website)
Mark West Union (K-6, 4 schools, 1,421 students, website)
Oak Grove Union (K-8, 2 schools, 722 students, website)
Piner-Olivet Union (K-8, 6 schools, 1,683 students)
Rincon Valley Union (K-6, 9 schools, 2,965 students, website)
Roseland (K-12, 3 schools, 1,994 students, website)
Santa Rosa City Schools:
Santa Rosa City (Elementary) (K-6, 14 schools, 4,734 students)
Santa Rosa City High (7-12, 19 schools, 11,964 students)
Wright (K-6, 3 schools, 1,435 students, website)
Sebastopol area:
Gravenstein Union (K-8, 2 schools, 508 students, website)
Sebastopol Union (K-8, 4 schools, 1,173 students, website)
Twin Hills Union (K-8, 4 schools, 908 students, website)
West Sonoma County Union High (9-12, 5 schools, 2,435 students, website)
Sonoma Valley Unified (K-12, 12 schools, 4,793 students, website)
Windsor Unified (K-12, 8 schools, 5,344 students)

See also
List of school districts in California by county

References

External links
District map

Sonoma
 
Sonoma